The 2015–16 Georgia Tech Yellow Jackets women's basketball team will represent Georgia Institute of Technology during the 2015–16 NCAA Division I women's basketball season. Returning as head coach was MaChelle Joseph entering her 13th season. The team plays its home games at Hank McCamish Pavilion in Atlanta, Georgia as members of the Atlantic Coast Conference. They finished the season 20–13, 8–8 in ACC play to finish in a tie for seventh place. They advanced to the quarterfinals of the ACC women's tournament where they lost to Louisville. They were invited to the Women's National Invitation Tournament which they defeated Mercer in the first round before losing to Tulane in the second round.

2015–16 media
All Yellow Jackets games will air on the Yellow Jackets IMG Sports Network. WREK once again serves as the home of the Ramblin Wreck women's basketball team.

Roster

Schedule

|-
!colspan=9 style=""| Exhibition

|-
!colspan=9 style=""| Non-conference regular season

|-
!colspan=9 style=""| ACC regular season

|-
!colspan=9 style=""| ACC Women's Tournament

|-
!colspan=9 style=""| WNIT

Source

See also
 2015–16 Georgia Tech Yellow Jackets men's basketball team

References

Georgia Tech Yellow Jackets women's basketball seasons
Georgia Tech
2016 Women's National Invitation Tournament participants